Aliki may refer to:

 Aliki (name), a given name, usually Greek
 Aliki, the penname of Aliki Brandenberg, born 1928, children's book author
 Ariki, a Polynesian chief
 Amelia Tokagahahau Aliki (1845–1895), queen of Uvea (Pacific Island)
 Alyki, a village and beach in Agkairia, Paros, Greece